Abdullah Aiasra is a retired Brigadier General of the Royal Jordanian Army. He held several prominent positions during his military career.

Aiasra was born in Jerash on 4 December 1952. Following high school, he enrolled in the Royal Military College in 1970, from which he graduated in 1972 with a diploma of higher education in Military Science, and a commission as a Second Lieutenant. Upon graduation, his first assignment was in the Royal Maintenance Corps. He graduated in Supply Management from the U.S. Army Quartermaster School at Fort Lee, Virginia (Class of 1978). He is also a graduate in Senior Management of the Naval Postgraduate School (NPS) at Monterey, California.

Aiasra was one of those who played a major role in putting a permanent administrative and technical plan for King Hussein Main Workshops (KHMW), which is the main manufacturing and rebuilding facility in the army.

Awards and decorations

1952 births
Living people
People from Jerash
Jordanian military personnel